Goniądz is a town in Poland, located at the Biebrza river, (pop. 1,915) in Mońki county (Powiat of Mońki) in Podlaskie Voivodeship in northeastern Poland. 80% of the town was destroyed in World War II. After its postwar reconstruction, it has become a local agriculture hub, as well as a tourist destination.

History 

The town was founded some time in the 14th century in dense forests covering the area back then. The first mention dates back to August 14, 1358, when a chronicler noted Goniądz as a seat of a powiat within the land of Wizna. On December 2, 1382, the dukes of Mazovia (Siemowit IV and his brother and co-regent Janusz I) awarded the Wizna castle, together with the surrounding land, to the Teutonic Order. The land was bought back from the Teutons in 1402, but at the same time the order sold it to the Duke of Lithuania. Because of that, the town was disputed by both the Kingdom of Poland, Duchy of Mazovia and the Grand Duchy of Lithuania, with the latter state briefly gaining the upper hand.

Eventually the series of Polish-Lithuanian Unions resulted with the town being somewhat of a borderland: owned by noble houses from both sides of the border, with laws of both states applied. In 1430 the duke of Lithuania Vytautas founded a church there. Other owners of the town also expanded the small castle, the most notable of them being Prince Michał Gliński, Mikołaj II Radziwiłł and Sigismund II Augustus, the future king of Poland. In 1547 Goniądz was granted with a city charter that was modeled on Chełm law. Four years later, King Sigismund Augustus decided that only Polish law be applied for the land surrounding Goniądz and finally in 1569 the town was annexed by Poland and remained within its borders until today.

In 1572 Goniądz became part of the starostship of Knyszyn; the following year the Sejm, or the Polish parliament, confirmed the city charter. The town continued to grow rapidly and in 1579 was granted with the right to trade with salt, one of the most expensive minerals back then. On May 28, 1621 a huge fire destroyed the town, but it was quickly rebuilt and by 1667 became a seat of local administration. By 1765 the town had 243 houses and roughly 1500 inhabitants, mostly Poles, but also Jews and Tatars. In 1775 a new church was erected by bishop of Przemyśl Antoni Betański.

World War II 
The Germans occupied the town for 10 Days in September 1939 and burnt the synagogue prior to handing the town over to Soviet forces. The town was reoccupied by the Germans on 26 June 1941 and after consulting with the local priest they appointed a collaborationist town council led by Jan Balonowski. On 29 June 1941 Polish policemen tortured some 30 Jews, identified as communists. On 2 July 1941 after a few Jews were found hiding in surrounding villages, the town council ordered that "All Jews present in nearby villages are ordered to return to town. Any farmers caught harboring a Jew will be shot alongside the Jew". On 4 July, an SS unit arrived in the town, assembled the Jews and humiliated them, and prior to leaving gave the Polish authorities a free hand in regards to alleged communists. Some prisoners were released in exchange for payment, but others were tortured or beaten to death. Survivor estimates vary between 20 and 180 dead alleged communists (mainly Jews, some Poles). On 6 July 1941, five Jewish youths were killed by German soldiers after they were caught by the Polish police outside of town. On 20–21 July 1941, Polish policeman, probably overseen by a small SS unit, instigated a pogrom in which 20 Jews were killed. Following the pogrom, and threatened with further violence, Jewish women conscripted for labor at the German military command at Osowiec, appealed for help from the local German colonel. The colonel dispatched a German military police unit which arrested and then executed six of the perpetrators for stealing Jewish property.

There were a number of attempts by Polish and subsequently German authorities to set up a closed ghetto, however after being bribed this was not carried out. 14 Jews were executed by the SS in August 1941 after being rounded up by Polish police as suspected communists. Jews were used for forced labor in a number of Wehrmacht enterprises. On 2 November 1942 the SS drove out most of the Jewish inhabitants to a transit camp in the village of Bogusze. From there they were sent to Treblinka extermination camp and Auschwitz concentration camp and most of them were murdered on arrival, 10 Goniądz Jews survived in the extermination camps. Another 10 survived hiding near Goniadz. In May 1944 the Germans arrested and shot dead 3 Jews and the Polish couple that was sheltering them. In 1949 some 10 Polish collaborators were tried together for the murder of 25 Jews on 7 July 1941; one received a life sentence and another a six-year term. In 1950 an additional Polish collaborator received a six-year sentence for a different incident.

References

External links 
 
 http://www.jewishgen.org/Yizkor/goniadz/goniadz.html

 
Cities and towns in Podlaskie Voivodeship
Podlachian Voivodeship
Belostoksky Uyezd
Białystok Voivodeship (1919–1939)
Belastok Region